The 1948 United States presidential election in Colorado took place on November 2, 1948, as part of the 1948 United States presidential election. State voters chose six representatives, or electors, to the Electoral College, who voted for president and vice president.

Colorado was won by incumbent President Harry S. Truman (D–Missouri), running with Senator Alben W. Barkley, with 51.88% of the popular vote, against Governor Thomas Dewey (R–New York), running with Governor Earl Warren, with 46.52% of the popular vote. As of the 2020 election, Truman remains the last candidate to carry Colorado without winning Larimer County, as well as the last Democrat to win the national election without Adams County. Colorado also marks Truman's strongest performance in a state that Dewey had won against Franklin D. Roosevelt in 1944.

Results

Results by county

References

Colorado
1948
1948 Colorado elections